The 1999–2000 Czech Extraliga season was the seventh season of the Czech Extraliga since its creation after the breakup of Czechoslovakia and the Czechoslovak First Ice Hockey League in 1993.

Standings

Playoffs

Quarterfinal
HC Sparta Praha - HC ČSOB Pojišťovna Pardubice 3:1 (1:0,1:0,1:1)
HC Sparta Praha - HC ČSOB Pojišťovna Pardubice 2:1 (0:0,2:1,0:0)
HC ČSOB Pojišťovna Pardubice - HC Sparta Praha 1:5 (0:2,0:2,1:1)
HC Hamé Zlín - HC Chemopetrol 1:2 (0:0,0:1,1:1)
HC Hamé Zlín - HC Chemopetrol 2:4 (1:0,0:2,1:2)
HC Chemopetrol - HC Hamé Zlín 2:3 (0:1,1:1,1:1)HC Chemopetrol - HC Hamé Zlín 3:1 (0:0,0:0,3:1)Vsetínská hokejová - HC České Budějovice 3:0 (2:0,1:0,0:0)Vsetínská hokejová - HC České Budějovice 6:3 (1:1,2:2,3:0)
HC České Budějovice - Vsetínská hokejová 0:3 (0:2,0:1,0:0)HC Oceláři Třinec - HC Keramika Plzeň 3:1 (1:0,1:0,1:1)
HC Oceláři Třinec - HC Keramika Plzeň 1:3 (0:1,0:1,1:1)HC Keramika Plzeň - HC Oceláři Třinec 9:0 (1:0,7:0,1:0)HC Keramika Plzeň - HC Oceláři Třinec 4:3 SN (1:2,1:1,1:0,0:0)

SemifinalHC Sparta Praha - HC Chemopetrol 4:1 (3:1,1:0,0:0)HC Sparta Praha - HC Chemopetrol 3:1 (1:0,1:1,1:0)
HC Chemopetrol - HC Sparta Praha 3:4 SN (1:2,0:1,2:0,0:0)Vsetínská hokejová - HC Keramika Plzeň 2:0 (1:0,0:0,1:0)Vsetínská hokejová - HC Keramika Plzeň 3:2 (1:0,0:0,2:2)
HC Keramika Plzeň - Vsetínská hokejová 2:3 PP (1:1,0:0,1:1,0:1)

Final
HC Sparta Praha - HC Vsetin 4–2, 4–0, 1-0

HC Sparta Praha is 1999-00 Czech champion.

Relegation

 HC Vítkovice - HC Dukla Jihlava 4:0HC Vítkovice - HC Dukla Jihlava 3:0 (1:0,1:0,1:0)HC Vítkovice - HC Dukla Jihlava 3:1 (1:1,2:0,0:0)
HC Dukla Jihlava - HC Vítkovice 2:3 (0:1,2:2,0:0)
HC Dukla Jihlava - HC Vítkovice 1:2 PP''' (1:0,0:0,0:1,0:1)

References

External links 
 

Czech Extraliga seasons
1999–2000 in Czech ice hockey
Czech